Family Secret is a 2014 South Korean television series starring Shin Eun-kyung,
Kim Seung-soo, Cha Hwa-yeon, and Ryu Tae-joon. It is the South Korean adaptation of the 2009 Chilean telenovela ¿Dónde está Elisa?. It aired on tvN, premiering on October 27, 2014 on Mondays to Thursdays at 21:40 (KST) time slot.

Synopsis
Jung Yun (Shin Eun-kyung) finds out that her daughter, Ko Eun-byul (Ryu Hyo-young), has disappeared on the day of her engagement ceremony. She then tries to find her, but her world is turned upside down when she discovers that her daughter was kidnapped by someone from her own family.

Cast

Main
 Shin Eun-kyung as Han Jung-yun (43)
 Kim Seung-soo as Ko Tae-sung (46)
 Lee Hyo-je as young Tae-sung
 Cha Hwa-yeon as Jin Joo-ran (late 60s)
 Ryu Tae-joon as Min Joon-hyuk (43)

People around Han Jung-yun
 Ryu Hyo-young as Ko Eun-byul / Baek Soo-jung (19)
 Choi Yong-min as Han Man-bok (late 60s)
 Lee Jung-joon as Han Jung-hoon (35)
 Lee Eon-jung as Kim Mi-yun (32)

People around Min Joon-hyuk
 Sun Woo as Sa Kyung-mi (32)
 Son Duk-ki as Kim Chi-joong (35)
 Shin Sung-won as Joo Chang-shik (late 40s)

People around Jin Joo-ran
 Lee Il-hwa as Go Tae-hee (48)
 Ahn Jung-hoon as Cha Sang-min (46)
 Shin Dong-mi as Go Tae-ran (41)
 Shin Ji-ho as Cha Gun-woo (23)
 Yoo Ri Kyung as Cha Yoo-ri (21)
 Yoon Chae Sung as Kang Chan (18)

Other people
 Yoo Seo-jin as Ma Hong-joo (mid 30s)
 Kim Jae-seung as Seo Min-hoo (28)
 Lee Hae-young as Jang Myung-suk (41)
 Yoo Joo-won
 Son Jang-woo

Ratings
In this table,  represent the lowest ratings and  represent the highest ratings.

References

External links
  
 

TVN (South Korean TV channel) television dramas
2014 South Korean television series debuts
2015 South Korean television series endings
Korean-language television shows
South Korean melodrama television series
South Korean television series based on non-South Korean television series